Nahuatl, Aztec, or Mexicano is a language or, by some definitions, a group of languages of the Uto-Aztecan language family. Varieties of Nahuatl are spoken by about  Nahua peoples, most of whom live mainly in Central Mexico and have smaller populations in the United States.

Nahuatl has been spoken in central Mexico since at least the seventh century CE. It was the language of the Aztec/Mexica, who dominated what is now central Mexico during the Late Postclassic period of Mesoamerican history. During the centuries preceding the Spanish and Tlaxcalan conquest of the Aztec Empire, the Aztecs had expanded to incorporate a large part of central Mexico. Their influence caused the variety of Nahuatl spoken by the residents of Tenochtitlan to become a prestige language in Mesoamerica.

After the conquest, when Spanish colonists and missionaries introduced the Latin alphabet, Nahuatl also became a literary language. Many chronicles, grammars, works of poetry, administrative documents and codices were written in it during the 16th and 17th centuries. This early literary language based on the Tenochtitlan variety has been labeled Classical Nahuatl. It is among the most studied and best-documented languages of the Americas.

Today, Nahuan languages are spoken in scattered communities, mostly in rural areas throughout central Mexico and along the coastline. There are considerable differences among varieties, and some are not mutually intelligible. Huasteca Nahuatl, with over one million speakers, is the most-spoken variety. All varieties have been subject to varying degrees of influence from Spanish. No modern Nahuan languages are identical to Classical Nahuatl, but those spoken in and around the Valley of Mexico are generally more closely related to it than those on the periphery. They are given the same status as Spanish within their respective regions.

Nahuan languages exhibit a complex morphology, or system of word formation, characterized by polysynthesis and agglutination. This means that morphemes – words or fragments of words that each contain their own separate meaning – are often strung together to make longer complex words. 

Through a very long period of development alongside other indigenous Mesoamerican languages, they have absorbed many influences, coming to form part of the Mesoamerican language area. Many words from Nahuatl were absorbed into Spanish and, from there, were diffused into hundreds of other languages in the region. Most of these loanwords denote things indigenous to central Mexico, which the Spanish heard mentioned for the first time by their Nahuatl names. English has also absorbed words of Nahuatl origin, including avocado, chayote, chili, chipotle, chocolate, atlatl, coyote, peyote, axolotl and tomato.

Classification

As a language label, the term Nahuatl encompasses a group of closely related languages or divergent dialects within the Nahuan branch of the Uto-Aztecan language family. The Mexican Instituto Nacional de Lenguas Indígenas (National Institute of Indigenous Languages) recognizes 30 individual varieties within the "language group" labeled Nahuatl. The Ethnologue recognizes 28 varieties with separate ISO codes. Sometimes Nahuatl is also applied to the Pipil language (Nawat) of El Salvador and Nicaragua. Regardless of whether Nahuatl is considered to refer to a dialect continuum or a group of separate languages, the varieties form a single branch within the Uto-Aztecan family, descended from a single Proto-Nahuan language. Within Mexico, the question of whether to consider individual varieties to be languages or dialects of a single language is highly political.

In the past, the branch of Uto-Aztecan to which Nahuatl belongs has been called Aztecan. From the 1990s onward, the alternative designation Nahuan has been frequently used instead, especially in Spanish-language publications. The Nahuan (Aztecan) branch of Uto-Aztecan is widely accepted as having two divisions: General Aztec and Pochutec.

General Aztec encompasses the Nahuatl and Pipil languages. Pochutec is a scantily attested language, which became extinct in the 20th century, and which Campbell and Langacker classify as being outside general Aztec. Other researchers have argued that Pochutec should be considered a divergent variant of the western periphery.

Nahuatl denotes at least Classical Nahuatl, together with related modern languages spoken in Mexico. The inclusion of Pipil in this group is debated among linguists. Lyle  classified Pipil as separate from the Nahuatl branch within general Aztecan, whereas dialectologists such as Una Canger, Karen Dakin, Yolanda Lastra, and Terrence Kaufman have preferred to include Pipil within the General Aztecan branch, citing close historical ties with the eastern peripheral dialects of General Aztec.

Canger introduced the scheme of a Central grouping and two Peripheral groups, and Lastra confirmed this notion, differing in some details.  demonstrated a basic split between Eastern and Western branches of Nahuan, considered to reflect the oldest division of the proto-Nahuan speech community.

Terminology
The terminology used to describe varieties of spoken Nahuatl is inconsistently applied. Many terms are used with multiple denotations, or a single dialect grouping goes under several names. Sometimes, older terms are substituted with newer ones or with the speakers' own name for their specific variety. The word Nahuatl is itself a Nahuatl word, probably derived from the word   ('clear language'). The language was formerly called Aztec because it was spoken by the Central Mexican peoples known as Aztecs. Now, the term Aztec is rarely used for modern Nahuan languages, but linguists' traditional name of Aztecan for the branch of Uto-Aztecan that comprises Nahuatl, Pipil, and Pochutec is still in use (although some linguists prefer Nahuan). Since 1978, the term General Aztec has been adopted by linguists to refer to the languages of the Aztecan branch excluding the Pochutec language.

The speakers of Nahuatl themselves often refer to their language as either Mexicano or some word derived from mācēhualli, the Nahuatl word for 'commoner'. One example of the latter is the Nahuatl spoken in Tetelcingo, Morelos, whose speakers call their language . The Pipil people of El Salvador do not call their own language Pipil, as most linguists do, but rather . The Nahuas of Durango call their language Mexicanero. Speakers of Nahuatl of the Isthmus of Tehuantepec call their language  ('the straight language'). Some speech communities use Nahuatl as the name for their language, although it seems to be a recent innovation. Linguists commonly identify localized dialects of Nahuatl by adding as a qualifier the name of the village or area where that variety is spoken.

History

Pre-Columbian period 
On the issue of geographic origin, the consensus of linguists during the 20th century was that the Uto-Aztecan language family originated in the southwestern United States. Evidence from archaeology and ethnohistory supports the thesis of a southward diffusion across the North American continent, specifically that speakers of early Nahuan languages migrated from Aridoamerica into central Mexico in several waves. But recently, the traditional assessment has been challenged by Jane H. Hill, who proposes instead that the Uto-Aztecan language family originated in central Mexico and spread northwards at a very early date. This hypothesis and the analyses of data that it rests upon have received serious criticism.

The proposed migration of speakers of the Proto-Nahuan language into the Mesoamerican region has been placed at sometime around AD 500, towards the end of the Early Classic period in Mesoamerican chronology. Before reaching the Mexican Plateau, pre-Nahuan groups probably spent a period of time in contact with the Corachol languages Cora and Huichol of northwestern Mexico (which are also Uto-Aztecan).

The major political and cultural center of Mesoamerica in the Early Classic period was Teotihuacan. The identity of the language(s) spoken by Teotihuacan's founders has long been debated, with the relationship of Nahuatl to Teotihuacan being prominent in that enquiry. While in the 19th and early 20th centuries it was presumed that Teotihuacan had been founded by speakers of Nahuatl, later linguistic and archaeological research tended to disconfirm this view. Instead, the timing of the Nahuatl influx was seen to coincide more closely with Teotihuacan's fall than its rise, and other candidates such as Totonacan identified as more likely. But recently, evidence from Mayan epigraphy of possible Nahuatl loanwords in Mayan languages has been interpreted as demonstrating that other Mesoamerican languages may have been borrowing words from Proto-Nahuan (or its early descendants) significantly earlier than previously thought, bolstering the possibility of a significant Nahuatl presence at Teotihuacan.

In Mesoamerica the Mayan, Oto-Manguean and Mixe–Zoque languages had coexisted for millennia. This had given rise to the Mesoamerican language area (language area refers to a set of language traits have become common among the area's languages by diffusion and not by evolution within a set of languages belonging to a common genetic subgrouping). After the Nahuas migrated into the Mesoamerican cultural zone, their language too adopted some of the traits defining the Mesoamerican Linguistic Area. Examples of such adopted traits are the use of relational nouns, the appearance of calques, or loan translations, and a form of possessive construction typical of Mesoamerican languages.

A language which was the ancestor of Pochutec split from Proto-Nahuan (or Proto-Aztecan) possibly as early as AD 400, arriving in Mesoamerica a few centuries earlier than the bulk of speakers of Nahuan languages. Some Nahuan groups migrated south along the Central American isthmus, reaching as far as Nicaragua. The critically endangered Pipil language of El Salvador is the only living descendant of the variety of Nahuatl once spoken south of present-day Mexico.

Beginning in the 7th century, Nahuan speakers rose to power in central Mexico. The people of the Toltec culture of Tula, which was active in central Mexico around the 10th century, are thought to have been Nahuatl speakers. By the 11th century, Nahuatl speakers were dominant in the Valley of Mexico and far beyond, with settlements including Azcapotzalco, Colhuacan and Cholula rising to prominence. Nahua migrations into the region from the north continued into the Postclassic period. One of the last of these migrations to arrive in the Valley of Mexico settled on an island in the Lake Texcoco and proceeded to subjugate the surrounding tribes. This group was the Mexica, who over the course of the next three centuries founded an empire named Tenochtitlan. Their political and linguistic influence came to extend into Central America and Nahuatl became a lingua franca among merchants and elites in Mesoamerica, e.g., among the Maya Kʼicheʼ people. As Tenochtitlan grew to become the largest urban center in Central America and one of the largest in the world at the time, it attracted speakers of Nahuatl from diverse areas giving birth to an urban form of Nahuatl with traits from many dialects. This urbanized variety of Tenochtitlan is what came to be known as Classical Nahuatl as documented in colonial times.

Colonial period
With the arrival of the Spanish in 1519, Nahuatl was displaced as the dominant regional language, but remained important in Nahua communities under Spanish rule. There is extensive colonial-era documentation in Nahuatl for Tlaxcala, Cuernavaca, Culhuacan, Coyoacan, Toluca and other locations in the Valley of Mexico and beyond. Starting in the 1970s, scholars of Mesoamerican ethnohistory have analyzed local-level texts in Nahuatl and other indigenous languages to gain insight into cultural change in the colonial era via linguistic changes, known at present as the New Philology. A number of these texts have been translated and published in part or in their entirety. The types of documentation include censuses, especially a very early set from the Cuernavaca region, town council records from Tlaxcala, and testaments of individual Nahuas.

Since the Spanish made alliances with first the Nahuatl speakers from Tlaxcala and later with the conquered Mexica of Tenochtitlan (Aztecs), the Nahuatl continued spreading throughout Mesoamerica in the decades after the conquest. Spanish expeditions with thousands of Nahua soldiers marched north and south to conquer new territories. Society of Jesus missions in northern Mexico and the Southwestern United States often included a barrio of Tlaxcaltec soldiers who remained to guard the mission. For example, some fourteen years after the northeastern city of Saltillo was founded in 1577, a Tlaxcaltec community was resettled in a separate nearby village, San Esteban de Nueva Tlaxcala, to cultivate the land and aid colonization efforts that had stalled in the face of local hostility to the Spanish settlement. As for the conquest of modern-day Central America, Pedro de Alvarado conquered Guatemala with the help of tens of thousands of Tlaxcaltec allies, who then settled outside of modern-day Antigua Guatemala.

As a part of their missionary efforts, members of various religious orders (principally Franciscan and Dominican friars and Jesuits) introduced the Latin alphabet to the Nahuas. Within the first twenty years after the Spanish arrival, texts were being prepared in the Nahuatl language written in Latin characters. Simultaneously, schools were founded, such as the Colegio de Santa Cruz de Tlatelolco in 1536, which taught both indigenous and classical European languages to both Native Americans and priests. Missionary grammarians undertook the writing of grammars, also called artes, of indigenous languages for use by priests. The first Nahuatl grammar, written by Andrés de Olmos, was published in 1547 – three years before the first French grammar. By 1645, four more had been published, authored respectively by Alonso de Molina (1571), Antonio del Rincón (1595), Diego de Galdo Guzmán (1642), and Horacio Carochi (1645). Carochi's is today considered the most important of the colonial-era grammars of Nahuatl. Carochi has been particularly important for scholars working in the New Philology, such that there is a 2001 English translation of Carochi's 1645 grammar by James Lockhart. Through contact with Spanish the Nahuatl language adopted many loan words, and as bilingualism intensified, changes in the grammatical structure of Nahuatl followed.

In 1570, King Philip II of Spain decreed that Nahuatl should become the official language of the colonies of New Spain in order to facilitate communication between the Spanish and natives of the colonies. This led to Spanish missionaries teaching Nahuatl to Amerindians living as far south as Honduras and El Salvador. During the 16th and 17th centuries, Classical Nahuatl was used as a literary language, and a large corpus of texts from that period exists today. They include histories, chronicles, poetry, theatrical works, Christian canonical works, ethnographic descriptions, and administrative documents. The Spanish permitted a great deal of autonomy in the local administration of indigenous towns during this period, and in many Nahuatl-speaking towns the language was the de facto administrative language both in writing and speech. A large body of Nahuatl literature was composed during this period, including the Florentine Codex, a twelve-volume compendium of Aztec culture compiled by Franciscan Bernardino de Sahagún; Crónica Mexicayotl, a chronicle of the royal lineage of Tenochtitlan by Fernando Alvarado Tezozómoc; Cantares Mexicanos, a collection of songs in Nahuatl; a Nahuatl-Spanish/Spanish-Nahuatl dictionary compiled by Alonso de Molina; and the Huei tlamahuiçoltica, a description in Nahuatl of the apparition of Our Lady of Guadalupe.

Grammars and dictionaries of indigenous languages were composed throughout the colonial period, but their quality was highest in the initial period. The friars found that learning all the indigenous languages was impossible in practice, so they concentrated on Nahuatl. For a time, the linguistic situation in Mesoamerica remained relatively stable, but in 1696, Charles II of Spain issued a decree banning the use of any language other than Spanish throughout the Spanish Empire. In 1770, another decree, calling for the elimination of the indigenous languages, did away with Classical Nahuatl as a literary language. Until Mexican Independence in 1821, the Spanish courts admitted Nahuatl testimony and documentation as evidence in lawsuits, with court translators rendering it in Spanish.

Modern period

Throughout the modern period the situation of indigenous languages has grown increasingly precarious in Mexico, and the numbers of speakers of virtually all indigenous languages have dwindled. Although the absolute number of Nahuatl speakers has actually risen over the past century, indigenous populations have become increasingly marginalized in Mexican society. In 1895, Nahuatl was spoken by over 5% of the population. By 2000, this proportion had fallen to 1.49%. Given the process of marginalization combined with the trend of migration to urban areas and to the United States, some linguists are warning of impending language death. At present Nahuatl is mostly spoken in rural areas by an impoverished class of indigenous subsistence agriculturists. According to the Mexican national statistics institute, INEGI, 51% of Nahuatl speakers are involved in the farming sector and 6 in 10 receive no wages or less than the minimum wage.

From the early 20th century to at least the mid-1980s, educational policies in Mexico focused on the Hispanicization of indigenous communities, teaching only Spanish and discouraging the use of indigenous languages. As a result, today there is no group of Nahuatl speakers having attained general literacy in Nahuatl, while their literacy rate in Spanish also remains much lower than the national average. Even so, Nahuatl is still spoken by well over a million people, of whom around 10% are monolingual. The survival of Nahuatl as a whole is not imminently endangered, but the survival of certain dialects is, and some dialects have already become extinct within the last few decades of the 20th century.

The 1990s saw the onset of a radical change in official Mexican government policies towards indigenous and linguistic rights. Developments of accords in the international rights arena combined with domestic pressures (such as social and political agitation by the Zapatista Army of National Liberation and indigenous social movements) led to legislative reforms and the creation of decentralized government agencies like the National Commission for the Development of Indigenous Peoples (CDI) and the Instituto Nacional de Lenguas Indígenas (INALI) with responsibilities for the promotion and protection of indigenous communities and languages.

In particular, the federal Ley General de Derechos Lingüísticos de los Pueblos Indígenas ['General Law on the Language Rights of the Indigenous Peoples', promulgated 13 March 2003] recognizes all the country's indigenous languages, including Nahuatl, as national languages and gives indigenous people the right to use them in all spheres of public and private life. In Article 11, it grants access to compulsory, bilingual and intercultural education. Nonetheless, progress towards institutionalizing Nahuatl and securing linguistic rights for its speakers has been slow.

Demography and distribution

Today, a spectrum of Nahuan languages are spoken in scattered areas stretching from the northern state of Durango to Tabasco in the southeast. Pipil, the southernmost Nahuan language, is spoken in El Salvador by a small number of speakers. According to IRIN-International, the Nawat Language Recovery Initiative project, there are no reliable figures for the contemporary numbers of speakers of Pipil. Numbers may range anywhere from "perhaps a few hundred people, perhaps only a few dozen".

According to the 2000 census by INEGI, Nahuatl is spoken by an estimated 1.45 million people, some 198,000 (14.9%) of whom are monolingual. There are many more female than male monolinguals, and women represent nearly two-thirds of the total number. The states of Guerrero and Hidalgo have the highest rates of monolingual Nahuatl speakers relative to the total Nahuatl speaking population, at 24.2% and 22.6%, respectively. For most other states the percentage of monolinguals among the speakers is less than 5%. This means that in most states more than 95% of the Nahuatl speaking population are bilingual in Spanish.

The largest concentrations of Nahuatl speakers are found in the states of Puebla, Veracruz, Hidalgo, San Luis Potosí, and Guerrero. Significant populations are also found in the State of Mexico, Morelos, and the Federal District, with smaller communities in Michoacán and Durango. Nahuatl became extinct in the states of Jalisco and Colima during the 20th century. As a result of internal migration within the country, Nahuatl speaking communities exist in all states in Mexico. The modern influx of Mexican workers and families into the United States has resulted in the establishment of a few small Nahuatl speaking communities in the U.S., particularly in California, New York, Texas, New Mexico and Arizona.

Phonology
Nahuan languages are defined as a subgroup of Uto-Aztecan by having undergone a number of shared changes from the Uto-Aztecan protolanguage (PUA). The table below shows the phonemic inventory of Classical Nahuatl as an example of a typical Nahuan language. In some dialects, the  phoneme, which was common in Classical Nahuatl, has changed into either , as in Isthmus Nahuatl, Mexicanero and Pipil, or into , as in Nahuatl of Pómaro, Michoacán. Many dialects no longer distinguish between short and long vowels. Some have introduced completely new vowel qualities to compensate, as is the case for Tetelcingo Nahuatl. Others have developed a pitch accent, such as Nahuatl of Oapan, Guerrero.

Phonemes 

* The glottal phoneme, called the saltillo, occurs only after vowels.

In many Nahuatl dialects vowel length contrast is vague, and in others it has become lost entirely. The dialect of Tetelcingo (nhg) developed the vowel length into a difference in quality:

Allophony
Most varieties have relatively simple patterns of sound alternation (allophony). In many dialects, the voiced consonants are devoiced in word-final position and in consonant clusters:  devoices to a voiceless palato-alveolar sibilant ,  devoices to a voiceless glottal fricative  or to a voiceless labialized velar approximant , and  devoices to voiceless alveolar lateral fricative . In some dialects, the first consonant in almost any consonant cluster becomes . Some dialects have productive lenition of voiceless consonants into their voiced counterparts between vowels. The nasals are normally assimilated to the place of articulation of a following consonant. The voiceless alveolar lateral affricate  is assimilated after  and pronounced .

Phonotactics
Classical Nahuatl and most of the modern varieties have fairly simple phonological systems. They allow only syllables with maximally one initial and one final consonant.
Consonant clusters occur only word-medially and over syllable boundaries. Some morphemes have two alternating forms: one with a vowel i to prevent consonant clusters and one without it. For example, the absolutive suffix has the variant forms -tli (used after consonants) and -tl (used after vowels). Some modern varieties, however, have formed complex clusters from vowel loss. Others have contracted syllable sequences, causing accents to shift or vowels to become long.

Stress 
Most Nahuatl dialects have stress on the penultimate syllable of a word. In Mexicanero from Durango, many unstressed syllables have disappeared from words, and the placement of syllable stress has become phonemic.

Morphology and syntax

The Nahuatl languages are agglutinative, polysynthetic languages that make extensive use of compounding, incorporation and derivation. That is, they can add many different prefixes and suffixes to a root until very long words are formed, and a single word can constitute an entire sentence.

The following verb shows how the verb is marked for subject, patient, object, and indirect object:

Nouns
The Nahuatl noun has a relatively complex structure. The only obligatory inflections are for number (singular and plural) and possession (whether the noun is possessed, as is indicated by a prefix meaning 'my', 'your', etc.). Nahuatl has neither case nor gender, but Classical Nahuatl and some modern dialects distinguish between animate and inanimate nouns. In Classical Nahuatl the animacy distinction manifested with respect to pluralization, as only animate nouns could take a plural form, and all inanimate nouns were uncountable (as the words bread and money are uncountable in English). Now, many speakers do not maintain this distinction and all nouns may take the plural inflection. One dialect, that of the Eastern Huasteca, has a distinction between two different plural suffixes for animate and inanimate nouns.

In most varieties of Nahuatl, nouns in the unpossessed singular form generally take an absolutive suffix. The most common forms of the absolutive are -tl after vowels, -tli after consonants other than l, and -li after l. Nouns that take the plural usually form the plural by adding one of the plural absolutive suffixes -tin or -meh, but some plural forms are irregular or formed by reduplication. Some nouns have competing plural forms.

Singular noun:

Plural animate noun:

Plural animate noun with reduplication:

Nahuatl distinguishes between possessed and unpossessed forms of nouns. The absolutive suffix is not used on possessed nouns. In all dialects, possessed nouns take a prefix agreeing with number and person of its possessor. Possessed plural nouns take the ending -.

Absolutive noun:

Possessed noun:

Possessed plural: 

Nahuatl does not have grammatical case but uses what is sometimes called a relational noun to describe spatial (and other) relations. These morphemes cannot appear alone but must occur after a noun or a possessive prefix. They are also often called postpositions or locative suffixes. In some ways these locative constructions resemble and can be thought of as locative case constructions. Most modern dialects have incorporated prepositions from Spanish that are competing with or that have completely replaced relational nouns.

Uses of relational noun/postposition/locative -pan with a possessive prefix:

Use with a preceding noun stem:

Noun compounds are commonly formed by combining two or more nominal stems or combining a nominal stem with an adjectival or verbal stem.

Pronouns
Nahuatl generally distinguishes three persons, both in the singular and plural numbers. In at least one modern dialect, the Isthmus-Mecayapan variety, there has come to be a distinction between inclusive (I/we and you) and exclusive (we but not you) forms of the first person plural:

First person plural pronoun in Classical Nahuatl:
 "we"

First person plural pronouns in Isthmus-Mecayapan Nahuat:
nejamēn "We, but not you" (= me & them)
tejamēn "We along with you" (= me & you & them)

Much more common is an honorific/non-honorific distinction, usually applied to second and third persons but not first.

Non-honorific forms:
 "you sg."
 "you pl."
 "he/she/it"

Honorific forms
 "you sg. honorific"
 "you pl. honorific"
 "he/she honorific"

Numerals

Nahuatl has a vigesimal (base-20) numbering system. Note that the  prefix at the beginning means 'one' (as in 'one hundred' and 'one thousand') and is replaced with the corresponding number to get the names of other multiples of the power. For example,  (2) ×  (20) =  (40),  (2) ×  (400) =  (800).

Verbs
The Nahuatl verb is quite complex and inflects for many grammatical categories. The verb is composed of a root, prefixes, and suffixes. The prefixes indicate the person of the subject, and person and number of the object and indirect object, whereas the suffixes indicate tense, aspect, mood and subject number.

Most Nahuatl dialects distinguish three tenses: present, past, and future, and two aspects: perfective and imperfective. Some varieties add progressive or habitual aspects. Many dialects distinguish at least the indicative and imperative moods, and some also have optative and vetative/prohibitive moods.

Most Nahuatl varieties have a number of ways to alter the valency of a verb. Classical Nahuatl had a passive voice (also sometimes defined as an impersonal voice), but this is not found in most modern varieties. However the applicative and causative voices are found in many modern dialects. Many Nahuatl varieties also allow forming verbal compounds with two or more verbal roots.

The following verbal form has two verbal roots and is inflected for causative voice and both a direct and indirect object:

Some Nahuatl varieties, notably Classical Nahuatl, can inflect the verb to show the direction of the verbal action going away from or towards the speaker. Some also have specific inflectional categories showing purpose and direction and such complex notions as "to go in order to" or "to come in order to", "go, do and return", "do while going", "do while coming", "do upon arrival", or "go around doing".

Classical Nahuatl and many modern dialects have grammaticalised ways to express politeness towards addressees or even towards people or things that are being mentioned, by using special verb forms and special "honorific suffixes".

Familiar verbal form:

Honorific verbal form:

Reduplication
Many varieties of Nahuatl have productive reduplication. By reduplicating the first syllable of a root a new word is formed. In nouns this is often used to form plurals, e.g.  'man' →  'men', but also in some varieties to form diminutives, honorifics, or for derivations. In verbs reduplication is often used to form a reiterative meaning (i.e. expressing repetition), for example in Nahuatl of Tezcoco: 
// 'he/she falls'
// 'he/she falls several times'
// 'they fall (many people)'

Syntax
Some linguists have argued that Nahuatl displays the properties of a non-configurational language, meaning that word order in Nahuatl is basically free. Nahuatl allows all possible orderings of the three basic sentence constituents. It is prolifically a pro-drop language: it allows sentences with omission of all noun phrases or independent pronouns, not just of noun phrases or pronouns whose function is the sentence subject. In most varieties independent pronouns are used only for emphasis. It allows certain kinds of syntactically discontinuous expressions.

Michel Launey argues that Classical Nahuatl had a verb-initial basic word order with extensive freedom for variation, which was then used to encode pragmatic functions such as focus and topicality. The same has been argued for some contemporary varieties.

It has been argued, most prominently by the linguist Michel Launey, that Classical Nahuatl syntax is best characterised by "omnipredicativity", meaning that any noun or verb in the language is in fact a full predicative sentence. A radical interpretation of Nahuatl syntactic typology, this nonetheless seems to account for some of the language's peculiarities, for example, why nouns must also carry the same agreement prefixes as verbs, and why predicates do not require any noun phrases to function as their arguments. For example, the verbal form  means 'he/she/it shouts', and with the second person prefix  it means 'you shout'. Nouns are inflected in the same way: the noun  means not just 'child', but also 'it is a child', and  means 'you are a child'. This prompts the omnipredicative interpretation, which posits that all nouns are also predicates. According to this interpretation, a phrase such as  should not be interpreted as meaning just 'the child screams' but, rather, 'it screams, (the one that) is a child'.

Contact phenomena
Nearly 500 years of intense contact between speakers of Nahuatl and speakers of Spanish, combined with the minority status of Nahuatl and the higher prestige associated with Spanish has caused many changes in modern Nahuatl varieties, with large numbers of words borrowed from Spanish into Nahuatl, and the introduction of new syntactic constructions and grammatical categories.

For example, a construction like the following, with several borrowed words and particles, is common in many modern varieties (Spanish loanwords in boldface):

In some modern dialects basic word order has become a fixed subject–verb–object, probably under influence from Spanish. Other changes in the syntax of modern Nahuatl include the use of Spanish prepositions instead of native postpositions or relational nouns and the reinterpretation of original postpositions/relational nouns into prepositions. In the following example, from Michoacán Nahual, the postposition -ka meaning 'with' appears used as a preposition, with no preceding object:

In this example from Mexicanero Nahuatl, of Durango, the original postposition/relational noun -pin 'in/on' is used as a preposition. Also, a conjunction borrowed from Spanish, occurs in the sentence.

Many dialects have also undergone a degree of simplification of their morphology that has caused some scholars to consider them to have ceased to be polysynthetic.

Vocabulary

Many Nahuatl words have been borrowed into the Spanish language, most of which are terms designating things indigenous to the Americas. Some of these loans are restricted to Mexican or Central American Spanish, but others have entered all the varieties of Spanish in the world. A number of them, such as chocolate, tomato and avocado have made their way into many other languages via Spanish.

For instance, in English, two of the most prominent are undoubtedly chocolate and tomato (from Nahuatl ). Other common words are coyote (from Nahuatl ), avocado (from Nahuatl ) and chile or chili (from Nahuatl ). The word chicle is also derived from Nahuatl  'sticky stuff, chicle'. Some other English words from Nahuatl are: Aztec (from ); cacao (from Nahuatl  'shell, rind'); ocelot (from ). Many well known toponyms also come from Nahuatl, including Mexico (from the Nahuatl word for the Aztec capital ) and Guatemala (from the word ).

Writing and literature

Writing 

Traditionally, Pre-Columbian Aztec writing has not been considered a true writing system, since it did not represent the full vocabulary of a spoken language in the way that the writing systems of the Old World or the Maya Script did. Therefore, generally Aztec writing was not meant to be read, but to be told. The elaborate codices were essentially pictographic aids for memorizing texts, which include genealogies, astronomical information, and tribute lists. Three kinds of signs were used in the system: pictures used as mnemonics (which do not represent particular words), logograms which represent whole words (instead of phonemes or syllables), and logograms used only for their sound values (i.e. used according to the rebus principle).

However, epigrapher Alfonso Lacadena has argued that by the eve of the Spanish invasion, one school of Nahua scribes, those of Tetzcoco, had developed a fully syllabic script which could represent spoken language phonetically in the same way that the Maya script did. Some other epigraphers have questioned the claim, arguing that although the syllabicity was clearly extant in some early colonial manuscripts (hardly any pre-Columbian manuscripts have survived), this could be interpreted as a local innovation inspired by Spanish literacy rather than a continuation of a pre-Columbian practice.

The Spanish introduced the Latin script, which was used to record a large body of Aztec prose, poetry and mundane documentation such as testaments, administrative documents, legal letters, etc. In a matter of decades pictorial writing was completely replaced with the Latin alphabet. No standardized Latin orthography has been developed for Nahuatl, and no general consensus has arisen for the representation of many sounds in Nahuatl that are lacking in Spanish, such as long vowels and the glottal stop. The orthography most accurately representing the phonemes of Nahuatl was developed in the 17th century by the Jesuit Horacio Carochi, building on the insights of another Jesuit, Antonio del Rincon. This orthography did not achieve a wide following outside of the Jesuit community.

When Nahuatl became the subject of focused linguistic studies in the 20th century, linguists acknowledged the need to represent all the phonemes of the language. Several practical orthographies were developed to transcribe the language, many using the Americanist transcription system. With the establishment of Mexico's Instituto Nacional de Lenguas Indígenas in 2004, new attempts to create standardized orthographies for the different dialects were resumed; however to this day there is no single official orthography for Nahuatl. Apart from dialectal differences, major issues in transcribing Nahuatl include:
 how to write the saltillo phoneme (in some dialects pronounced as a glottal stop  and in others as an ), which has been spelled with j, h, ꞌ (apostrophe), or a grave accent on the preceding vowel, but which traditionally has often been omitted in writing.
 whether and how to represent vowel length, e.g. by double vowels or by the use of macrons.
In 2018, Nahua peoples from 16 states in the country began collaborating with INALI creating a new modern orthography called Yankwiktlahkwilolli, designed to be the standardized orthography of Nahuatl in the coming years. The modern writing has much greater use in the modern variants than in the classic variant, since the texts, documents and literary works of the time usually use the Jesuit one.

Literature

Among the indigenous languages of the Americas, the extensive corpus of surviving literature in Nahuatl dating as far back as the 16th century may be considered unique. Nahuatl literature encompasses a diverse array of genres and styles, the documents themselves composed under many different circumstances. Preconquest Nahua had a distinction between  'speech' and second  'song', akin to the distinction between "prose" and "poetry".

Nahuatl  prose has been preserved in different forms. Annals and chronicles recount history, normally written from the perspective of a particular altepetl (locally based polity) and often combining mythical accounts with real events. Important works in this genre include those from Chalco written by Chimalpahin, from Tlaxcala by Diego Muñoz Camargo, from Mexico-Tenochtitlan by Fernando Alvarado Tezozomoc and those of Texcoco by Fernando Alva Ixtlilxochitl. Many annals recount history year-by-year and are normally written by anonymous authors. These works are sometimes evidently based on pre-Columbian pictorial year counts that existed, such as the Cuauhtitlan annals and the Anales de Tlatelolco. Purely mythological narratives are also found, like the "Legend of the Five Suns", the Aztec creation myth recounted in Codex Chimalpopoca.

One of the most important works of prose written in Nahuatl is the twelve-volume compilation generally known as the Florentine Codex, authored in the mid-16th century by the Franciscan missionary Bernardino de Sahagún and a number of Nahua speakers. With this work Sahagún bestowed an enormous ethnographic description of the Nahua, written in side-by-side translations of Nahuatl and Spanish and illustrated throughout by color plates drawn by indigenous painters. Its volumes cover a diverse range of topics: Aztec history, material culture, social organization, religious and ceremonial life, rhetorical style and metaphors. The twelfth volume provides an indigenous perspective on the conquest. Sahagún also made a point of trying to document the richness of the Nahuatl language, stating:

Nahuatl poetry is principally preserved in two sources: the Cantares Mexicanos and the Romances de los señores de Nueva España, both collections of Aztec songs written down in the 16th and 17th centuries. Aztec poetry makes rich use of metaphoric imagery and themes and are lamentation of the brevity of human existence, the celebration of valiant warriors who die in battle, and the appreciation of the beauty of life.

Stylistics
The Aztecs distinguished between at least two social registers of language: the language of commoners and the language of the nobility. The latter was marked by the use of a distinct rhetorical style. Since literacy was confined mainly to these higher social classes, most of the existing prose and poetical documents were written in this style. An important feature of this high rhetorical style of formal oratory was the use of parallelism, whereby the orator structured their speech in couplets consisting of two parallel phrases. For example:

'May we not die'

'May we not perish'

Another kind of parallelism used is referred to by modern linguists as difrasismo, in which two phrases are symbolically combined to give a metaphorical reading. Classical Nahuatl was rich in such diphrasal metaphors, many of which are explicated by Sahagún in the Florentine Codex and by Andrés de Olmos in his Arte. Such  include:

'The flower, the song' – meaning 'poetry'

'the tail, the wing' – meaning 'the common people'

'the chest, the box' – meaning 'something secret'

'the heart, the blood' – meaning 'cacao'

'the drool, the spittle' – meaning 'lies'

Sample text
The sample text below is an excerpt from a statement issued in Nahuatl by Emiliano Zapata in 1918 in order to convince the Nahua towns in the area of Tlaxcala to join the Revolution against the regime of Venustiano Carranza. The orthography employed in the letter is improvised, and does not distinguish long vowels and only sporadically marks  (with both  and acute accent).

See also
 Vocabulario manual de las lenguas castellana y mexicana (a Spanish-Nahuatl dictionary)
 Vocabulario trilingüe (dictionary of Spanish, Latin, and Nahuatl)

Notes

Content notes

Citations

Bibliography

 

 

 
 
 
 
 
 
 
 
 
 
 
 
 
 
 
 

 
 
 
  
 
 
 
 
 
 
 
 

 
 
 
 
pdf
 

 
 

 
 
 

 
 
 
 
 
 
 
 
 
 
  
 
 
 
 
 
 
 
 
:

Further reading

Dictionaries of Classical Nahuatl
 de Molina, Fray Alonso: Vocabulario en Lengua Castellana y Mexicana y Mexicana y Castellana. [1555] Reprint: Porrúa México 1992
 Karttunen, Frances, An analytical dictionary of Náhuatl. Univ. of Oklahoma Press, Norman 1992
 Siméon, Rémi: Diccionario de la Lengua Náhuatl o Mexicana. [Paris 1885] Reprint: México 2001

Grammars of Classical Nahuatl
 Carochi, Horacio. Grammar of the Mexican Language: With an Explanation of its Adverbs (1645) Translated by James Lockhart. Stanford University Press. 2001.
 Lockhart, James: Nahuatl as written: lessons in older written Nahuatl, with copious examples and texts, Stanford 2001
 Sullivan, Thelma: Compendium of Nahuatl Grammar, Univ. of Utah Press, 1988.
 Campbell, Joe and Frances Karttunen, Foundation course in Náhuatl grammar. Austin 1989
 Launey, Michel. Introducción a la lengua y a la literatura Náhuatl. México D.F.: UNAM. 1992 (Spanish); An Introduction to Classical Nahuatl [English translation/adaptation by Christopher Mackay], 2011, Cambridge University Press.
 Andrews, J. Richard. Introduction to Classical Nahuatl University of Oklahoma Press: 2003 (revised edition)

Modern dialects
 Ronald W. Langacker (ed.): Studies in Uto-Aztecan Grammar 2: Modern Aztec Grammatical Sketches, Summer Institute of Linguistics Publications in Linguistics, 56. Dallas, TX: Summer Institute of Linguistics and the University of Texas at Arlington, pp. 1–140. . OCLC 6086368. 1979. (Contains studies of Nahuatl from Michoacan, Tetelcingo, Huasteca and North Puebla)
 Canger, Una. Mexicanero de la Sierra Madre Occidental, Archivo de Lenguas Indígenas de México, #24. México D.F.: El Colegio de México. . OCLC 49212643. 2001 (Spanish)
 Campbell, Lyle. The Pipil Language of El Salvador, Mouton Grammar Library (No. 1). Berlin: Mouton Publishers. 1985. . OCLC 13433705.
 Wolgemuth, Carl. Gramática Náhuatl (melaʼtájto̱l) de los municipios de Mecayapan y Tatahuicapan de Juárez, Veracruz, 2nd edition. 2002.

Miscellaneous
 The Nahua Newsletter: edited by the Center for Latin American and Caribbean Studies of the Indiana University (Chief Editor Alan Sandstrom)
 Estudios de Cultura Náhuatl: special interest-yearbook of the Instituto de Investigaciones Históricas (IIH) of the Universidad Autónoma de México (UNAM), Ed.: Miguel León Portilla
 A Catalogue of Pre-1840 Nahuatl Works Held by The Lilly Library from The Indiana University Bookman No. 11. November, 1973: 69–88.
 Collection of Nahuatl of the Sierra Nororiental de Puebla, Mexico of Jonathan Amith, containing recordings in Nahuatl by native speakers and transcriptions, from the Archive of Indigenous Languages of Latin America.
Barnstone, Willis (2003). Literatures of Latin America: From Antiquity to Present. Princeton: Prentice Hall.

External links

Online Nahuatl Dictionary – Wired Humanities Projects, University of Oregon

 
Indigenous languages of Mexico
Agglutinative languages
Languages with own distinct writing systems
Mesoamerican languages
Polysynthetic languages
Uto-Aztecan languages
Verb–subject–object languages